Saryu Singh (Saryoo Singh) was a social thinker, a writer, a philosopher and was one of the prominent leaders during the freedom struggle in Bihar, who later was elected twice as MLA from Aurangabad, Bihar.

Political life
Saryu Singh was one of the most prominent freedom fighter from Aurangabad, Bihar and a veteran socialist leader. Post independence, he was made president of freedom fighter federation and was elected twice as MLA from Aurangabad, Bihar.

References 

Indian socialists
20th-century Indian politicians
1921 births
2012 deaths
Praja Socialist Party
21st-century Indian politicians
Praja Socialist Party politicians
Indian political party founders
Indians imprisoned during the Emergency (India)